The 1941 South Carolina Gamecocks football team was an American football team that represented the University of South Carolina in the Southern Conference (SoCon) during the 1941 college football season. In their fourth season under head coach Rex Enright, the Gamecocks compiled a 4–4–1 record (4–0–1 against conference opponents), finished second in the SoCon, and were outscored by a total of 103 to 100. The team played its home games at Carolina Stadium in Columbia, South Carolina.

Back Stan Stasica was selected by both the Associated Press (AP) and United Press (UP) as a first-team player on the 1941 All-Southern Conference football team.

Schedule

References

South Carolina
South Carolina Gamecocks football seasons
South Carolina Gamecocks football